Hongya may refer to:

Hongya Cave, tourist shopping centre, Chongqing, China
Hongya County, county in Sichuan, China
Hongya Village, or Taktser, Tibetan village in Amdo, Tibet, now known as Qinghai, China